Noise Collection Vol. 1 is a compilation album by American aggrotech / industrial metal band Combichrist. The first disc is their album The Joy of Gunz, and the second disc collects their first three EPs: Kiss the Blade, Blut Royale and Sex, Drogen und Industrial.

Track listing

2010 albums
Combichrist albums